Sunnybrook  is a western suburb of Rotorua in the Bay of Plenty Region of New Zealand's North Island.

Demographics

Sunnybrook had a population of 2,067 at the 2018 New Zealand census, an increase of 183 people (9.7%) since the 2013 census, and an increase of 126 people (6.5%) since the 2006 census. There were 705 households, comprising 987 males and 1,083 females, giving a sex ratio of 0.91 males per female. The median age was 35.8 years (compared with 37.4 years nationally), with 480 people (23.2%) aged under 15 years, 399 (19.3%) aged 15 to 29, 909 (44.0%) aged 30 to 64, and 279 (13.5%) aged 65 or older.

Ethnicities were 73.9% European/Pākehā, 32.1% Māori, 3.3% Pacific peoples, 8.3% Asian, and 1.3% other ethnicities. People may identify with more than one ethnicity.

The percentage of people born overseas was 17.1, compared with 27.1% nationally.

Although some people chose not to answer the census's question about religious affiliation, 51.1% had no religion, 35.0% were Christian, 1.6% had Māori religious beliefs, 0.4% were Hindu, 0.4% were Muslim, 1.0% were Buddhist and 1.6% had other religions.

Of those at least 15 years old, 264 (16.6%) people had a bachelor's or higher degree, and 294 (18.5%) people had no formal qualifications. The median income was $29,600, compared with $31,800 nationally. 207 people (13.0%) earned over $70,000 compared to 17.2% nationally. The employment status of those at least 15 was that 804 (50.7%) people were employed full-time, 258 (16.3%) were part-time, and 84 (5.3%) were unemployed.

References

Suburbs of Rotorua
Populated places in the Bay of Plenty Region